Disperse Red 9, or 1-(methylamino)anthraquinone, is a red dye derived from anthraquinone. Disperse Red 9 is used in some older red and violet-red colored smoke formulations. It is used in the M18 colored smoke grenade and also often in dye packs. Its smoke producing properties can be improved by coating the dye particles with an inert material, e.g. an epoxy resin.

References

Anthraquinone dyes
Aromatic amines